Sangatta is a town located in East Kutai Regency, East Kalimantan, Indonesia. It is however, not an autonomous city and consists of two districts within the regency, North Sangatta (the urban district, with 120,873 inhabitants in 2020) and South Sangatta (a largely rural area with 30,117 inhabitants in 2020). It is the location of East Kutai coal mine, which is one of the biggest coal mines in the world, as well as the biggest in Asia.

References 

East Kutai Regency
Populated places in East Kalimantan